Volume IV The Classic Singles 88–93 is the first compilation album by British group Soul II Soul, released in 1993. Along with the band's biggest hit singles released up to 1993, the album also includes one new song, "Wish".

Track listing
"Back to Life (However Do You Want Me)"
"Keep On Movin'"
"Get a Life"
"A Dream's a Dream"
"Missing You"
"Just Right"
"Move Me No Mountain"
"People"
"Fairplay"
"Jazzie's Groove"
"Wish"
"Joy"
"Keep On Movin'" (Mafia & Fluxy Mix)
"Fairplay" (Ethnic Boys Mix)
"Back to Life" (Bonus Beats)

Personnel
Adapted from AllMusic.
Melissa Bell – performer, primary artist
Dave Darlington – mixing engineer
Eugene Eugenius Ellis – engineer
Kenny "Dope" Gonzalez – mixing
Nellee Hooper – producer
David James – art direction
Jazzie B – producer
Marcie Lewis – performer
Kym Mazelle – performer
Richie Stephens – performer
Caron Wheeler – performer
Rose Windross – performer

Charts and certifications

Weekly charts

Year-end charts

Certifications

References

External links

1993 compilation albums
Soul II Soul albums
Albums produced by Nellee Hooper
Virgin Records compilation albums